Canons Ashby Priory was an Augustinian priory at Canons Ashby, Northamptonshire, England.

History
The Priory was founded by Stephen la Leye on a site to the south of the present church between 1147 and 1151 in the reign of Henry II.

In 1253 the Augustinians were granted a licence to dig the Norwell, which still exists north of the present church, to supply water to the priory.

In 1452, John Nantewych is named as the prior of Canons Assheby. 

In 1537 after the Dissolution of the Monasteries the Crown granted the priory and its estates to Sir Francis Bryan, a close ally of Henry VIII. Bryan held the estate for only about a year before selling it in 1538 to Sir John Cope, a wealthy Banbury lawyer. Sir John's daughter Elizabeth inherited what is thought to have been the priory farmhouse [wrong – Wilkyns farm was part of John Dryden's inheritance. Copes Ashbie – across the road – was inherited by Elizabeth's brother, who died early leaving his sons as Wards of the Dryden family] . In 1551 she married John Dryden, who extended the building to form the earliest parts of Canons Ashby House.

Part of the building survives: the Church of England parish church of St Mary dates from about 1250 and this, together with Canons Ashby House, is now owned by the National Trust. Its power and size can be judged by its outlying buildings which cover a large area of the surrounding countryside.

Burials
Sir Erasmus Dryden, 1st Baronet and other members of his family
Sir John Dryden, 2nd Baronet
Sir Robert Dryden, 3rd Baronet (c. 1638–1708)
Sir Erasmus Henry Dryden, 5th Baronet

See also
List of English abbeys, priories and friaries serving as parish churches

References

Sources

External links

12th-century establishments in England
1530s disestablishments in England
Augustinian monasteries in England
Christian monasteries established in the 12th century
Churches in Northamptonshire
Grade II* listed buildings in Northamptonshire
Monasteries in Northamptonshire
Monasteries dissolved under the English Reformation